Minal Khan (née Khan ; born on 20 November 1998) is a Pakistani television actress. She made her acting debut as a child artist in Kaash Main Teri Beti Na Hoti (2011) and since then appeared in television serials including Quddusi Sahab Ki Bewah (2014), Sun Yaara (2016), Hum Sab Ajeeb Se Hain (2017), Parchayee (2018), Ki Jaana Main Kaun (2018), Hasad (2019). Jalan (2020) and Ishq hai (2021).

Personal life
Khan was born along with her twin sister Aiman Khan on 20 November 1998. She attended Ideal Federal Secondary school in Karachi. Her mother Uzma Mubeen is a housewife. Besides Aiman, she has three brothers. She belongs to the Urdu Speaking family from Karachi. She married her co-actor from drama "Parachayee", Ahsan Mohsin Ikram on 11 Jun 2021 and both later tied knot on 10th September 2021.

Career
Khan's acting debut was in the Geo TV drama Kaash Main Teri Beti Na Hoti (2011–12). This was followed by a supporting role on the sitcom series Quddusi Sahab Ki Bewah (2012) on ARY Digital.

She appeared in the 2013 social drama Mann Ke Moti. She was seen along with Yasra Rizvi, Faysal Qureshi and her sister Aiman Khan. Subsequently, she gained wider recognition for appearing in a supporting role in the 2014 drama Mere Meherbaan, the romantic drama Mol (2015), and comedy-dramas Mithu Aur Aapa (2015), Joru Ka Ghulam (2016) and Hum Sab Ajeeb Se Hain (2016).

Khan's first lead role as a protagonist was in Urdu 1's Beti To Main Bhi Hun (2017), as the simple, studious and reclusive Haya, followed by the lead role in Hum TV's Parchayee as Pari. Khan briefly appeared in one episode of Angeline Malik's directorial anthology series Ustani Jee on Hum TV. She was also seen as a simple housewife in Kabhi Band Kabhi Baja opposite Hammad Farooqui (2018) and as Sualeha in A-Plus TV's Ghamand (2018).

Television

Awards and nominations

References

External links 
 
 

Living people
1998 births
21st-century Pakistani actresses
Pakistani television actresses
Actresses from Karachi
Pakistani twins